Brenda Mae Tarpley (born December 11, 1944), known professionally as Brenda Lee, is an American singer. Performing rockabilly, pop and country music, she had 47 US chart hits during the 1960s and is ranked fourth in that decade, surpassed only by Elvis Presley, the Beatles and Ray Charles. She is known for her 1960 hit "I'm Sorry" and 1958's "Rockin' Around the Christmas Tree", which has become a Christmas standard.

At 4 ft 9 inches tall (approximately 145 cm), she received the nickname "Little Miss Dynamite" in 1957, after recording the song "Dynamite" when she was 12, and was one of the earliest pop stars to have a major contemporary international following. In 1969, Lee returned to the charts with her recording "Johnny One Time" penned by A. L. "Doodle" Owens and Dallas Frazier. The song reached #3 on Billboards Adult Contemporary Chart and #41 on the Billboard Hot 100. The song also earned Lee her second Grammy nomination for Best Pop Female Vocal. Later success came with a return to her roots as a country singer, with a string of hits through the 1970s and 1980s.

Lee has sold more than 100 million records worldwide. She is a member of the Rock and Roll, Country Music and Rockabilly Halls of Fame. She is also a Grammy Lifetime Achievement Award recipient. Lee is the first woman to be inducted into both the Rock and Roll and Country Music Halls of Fame.

Early life and education 
Brenda Lee was born Brenda Mae Tarpley on December 11, 1944, in the charity ward of Grady Memorial Hospital in Atlanta, Georgia, to parents Annie Grayce (née Yarbrough) and Ruben Lindsey Tarpley. She weighed 4 pounds 11 ounces at birth. Lee attended grade schools wherever her father found work, primarily between Atlanta and Augusta. Her family was poor. As a child, she shared a bed with her brother and sister in a series of three-room houses without running water. Life centered on her parents finding work, their family, and the Baptist church, where she began singing solos every Sunday.

Lee's father was a farmer's son in Georgia's red-clay belt. Standing 5 ft 7 inches (170 cm), he was an excellent left-handed pitcher and played baseball while serving for 11 years in the United States Army. Her mother came from a working class family in Greene County, Georgia.

Though her family did not have indoor plumbing until after her father's death, they had a battery-powered table radio that fascinated Brenda as a baby. Both her mother and sister remembered taking her repeatedly to a local candy store before she turned three. One of them would stand her on the counter and she would earn candy or coins for singing.

Career

Child performer
Lee's voice, face and stage presence won her wider attention from the time she was five years old. At age six, she won a local singing contest sponsored by local elementary schools. The reward was a live appearance on an Atlanta radio show, Starmakers Revue, where she performed for the next year.

Her father died in 1953 in a construction accident, and by the time she turned ten she was the primary breadwinner of her family, through singing at events and on local radio and television shows. During that time, she appeared regularly on the country music show "TV Ranch" on WAGA-TV in Atlanta; she was so short, the host would lower a stand microphone as low as it would go and stand her up on a wooden crate to reach it. In 1955, Grayce Tarpley was remarried to Buell "Jay" Rainwater, who moved the family to Cincinnati, Ohio, where he worked at the Jimmie Skinner Music Center. Lee performed with Skinner at the record shop on two Saturday programs broadcast over Newport, Kentucky, radio station WNOP. The family soon returned to Georgia, but this time to Augusta, and Lee appeared on the show The Peach Blossom Special on WJAT-AM in Swainsboro.

National exposure and stardom

Lee's breakthrough came in February 1955, when she turned down $30 ($334 in 2022 value) to appear on a Swainsboro radio station to see Red Foley and a touring promotional unit of his ABC-TV program Ozark Jubilee in Augusta. An Augusta disc jockey persuaded Foley to hear her sing before the show. Foley did and agreed to let her perform "Jambalaya" on stage that night, unrehearsed. Foley later recounted the moments following her introduction:

On March 31, 1955, the 10-year-old made her network debut on Ozark Jubilee in Springfield, Missouri. Although her five-year contract with the show was broken by a 1957 lawsuit brought by her mother and her manager, she nevertheless made regular appearances on the program throughout its run.

Less than two months later, on July 30, 1956, Decca Records offered her a contract, and her first record was "Jambalaya", backed with "Bigelow 6-200". Lee's second single featured two novelty Christmas tunes: "I'm Gonna Lasso Santa Claus", and "Christy Christmas". Though she turned 12 on December 11, 1956, both of the first two Decca singles credit her as "Little Brenda Lee (9 Years Old)."

Neither of the 1956 releases charted, but her first issue in 1957, "One Step at a Time", written by Hugh Ashley, became a hit in both the pop and country fields. Her next hit, "Dynamite", coming out of a 4-foot 9-inch frame, led to her lifelong nickname, Little Miss Dynamite.

Lee first attracted attention performing in country music venues and shows; however, her label and management felt it best to market her exclusively as a pop artist, the result being that none of her best-known recordings from the 1960s were released to country radio, and despite her country sound, with top Nashville session people, she did not have another country hit until 1969 with "Johnny One Time".

Biggest hits: 1958–1966
Lee achieved her biggest success on the pop charts in the late 1950s through the mid-1960s with rockabilly and rock and roll-styled songs. Her biggest hits included "Jambalaya", "Sweet Nothin's" (No. 4, written by country musician Ronnie Self), "I Want to Be Wanted" (No. 1), "All Alone Am I" (No. 3) and "Fool#1" (No. 3). She had more hits with the more pop-based songs "That's All You Gotta Do" (No. 6), "Emotions" (No. 7), "You Can Depend on Me" (No. 6), "Dum Dum" (No. 4), 1962's "Break It to Me Gently" (No. 2), "Everybody Loves Me But You" (No. 6), and "As Usual" (No. 12). Lee's total of nine consecutive top 10 Billboard Hot 100 hits from "That's All You Gotta Do" in 1960 through "All Alone Am I" in 1962 set a record for a female solo artist that was not equaled until 1986 by Madonna.

The biggest-selling track of Lee's career was a Christmas song. In 1958, when she was 13, producer Owen Bradley asked her to record a new song by Johnny Marks, who had had success writing Christmas tunes for country singers, most notably "Rudolph the Red-Nosed Reindeer" (Gene Autry) and "A Holly Jolly Christmas" (Burl Ives). Lee recorded the song, "Rockin' Around the Christmas Tree", in July with a prominent twanging guitar part by Hank Garland and raucous sax soloing by Nashville icon Boots Randolph. Decca released it as a single that November, but it sold only 5,000 copies, and did not do much better when it was released again in 1959. However, over subsequent years, it eventually sold more than five million copies. Since 2017, the song has appeared at the end of each year on the Billboard Hot 100, having spent (as of December 7, 2022), 48 weeks on the Hot 100, peaking at number 2 in 2019.

In 1960, she recorded her signature song, "I'm Sorry", which hit No. 1 on the Billboard pop chart. It was her first gold single and was nominated for a Grammy Award. Even though it was not released as a country song, it was among the first big hits to use what was to become the Nashville sound — a string orchestra and legato harmonized background vocals. "Rockin' Around the Christmas Tree" was finally noticed in its third release a few months later, and sales snowballed; the song remains a perennial favorite each December and is the record with which she is most identified by contemporary audiences.

Her last top ten single on the pop charts in the United States (besides the reappearance each November-December since 2017 of "Rockin' Around the Christmas Tree") was 1963's "Losing You" (No. 6), though she continued to have other chart hits such as 1964's "As Usual" (which peaked at No. 12 in the US and made No. 5 in the UK), her 1966 song "Coming on Strong" (which peaked at No.11 in the US) and "Is It True" (No.17 in both the US and the UK) in 1964. The latter, featuring Big Jim Sullivan, Jimmy Page on guitars, Bobby Graham on drums, was her only hit single recorded in London, England, and was produced by Mickie Most (but the slide guitar and background singers were overdubbed in Nashville). It was recorded at Decca Records' number two studio at their West Hampstead complex, as was the UK B-side, a version of Ray Charles' 1959 classic cut, "What'd I Say?", which was not released in America. The A-side "Is It True?" was composed by noted British songwriting team Ken Lewis and John Carter, who were also members of UK hitmakers the Ivy League.

International fame
Lee was popular in the UK from early in her career. She performed on television in the UK in 1959, before she had achieved much pop recognition in the United States. Her first hit single in the UK was "Sweet Nothin's", which reached No.4 on the UK singles chart in the spring of 1960. She subsequently had a UK hit (in 1961) with "Let's Jump the Broomstick", a rockabilly number recorded in 1959, which had not charted in the United States, but reached No.12 in the UK.

Lee had two Top Ten hits in the UK that were not released as singles in her native country: the first, "Speak to Me Pretty" peaked at No.3 in May 1962 and was her greatest hit in the UK by chart placing, swiftly followed by "Here Comes That Feeling", which reached No.5 in the summer of 1962. The latter was issued as the B-side to "Everybody Loves Me But You" in the United States (which peaked at No.6 on the Billboard Hot 100); however, "Here Comes That Feeling" also made an appearance in the Billboard Hot 100, peaking at No.89, despite its B-side status in the US.

In 1962, while touring West Germany, she appeared at the famous Star-Club, Hamburg, with the Beatles as the opening act. Lee also had big hits in the UK with "All Alone Am I" (No.7 in 1963) and "As Usual" (No.5 in 1964).

Brenda Lee first visited England for three days in April 1959 as a last-minute replacement on "Oh Boy!". She first toured the UK in March and April 1962 with Gene Vincent and Sounds Incorporated (as her backing group), and she toured the country for a second time in March 1963, this time supported by the Bachelors, Sounds Incorporated, Tony Sheridan, and Mike Berry.

Brenda Lee also toured in Ireland in 1963 and appeared on the front cover of the Irish dancing and entertainment magazine Spotlight in April that year.

After appearing at the annual Royal Variety Performance before Queen Elizabeth II at the London Palladium on November 2, 1964, Lee toured Britain again in November and December 1964, supported by (amongst others) Manfred Mann, Johnny Kidd & the Pirates, the John Barry Seven, Wayne Fontana & the Mindbenders, Marty Wilde, the Tornados and Heinz Burt.

Later career

During the early 1970s, Lee re-established herself as a country music artist. In a 1996 memoir, television producer Sam Lovullo stated that Lee's 1972 appearance on his variety show Hee Haw had been instrumental to her comeback. Lee earned a string of top ten hits in the United States on the country charts, the first of which was 1973's "Nobody Wins", which reached the top five that spring and became her last Top 100 pop hit, peaking at No. 70. The follow-up, the Mark James composition "Sunday Sunrise", reached No. 6 on Billboard magazine's Hot Country Singles chart that October. Other major hits included "Wrong Ideas" and "Big Four Poster Bed" (1974); and "Rock on Baby" and "He's My Rock" (both 1975).

After a few years of lesser hits, Lee began another run at the top ten with 1979's "Tell Me What It's Like". Two follow-ups also reached the Top 10 in 1980: "The Cowgirl and the Dandy" and "Broken Trust" (the latter featuring vocal backing by the Oak Ridge Boys). A 1982 album, The Winning Hand, featuring Lee along with Dolly Parton, Kris Kristofferson and Willie Nelson, was a surprise hit, reaching the top ten on the U.S. country albums chart. Her last well-known hit was 1984's "Hallelujah, I Love Her So" in duet with George Jones (Lee sang this song individually before and released in 1960 on This Is...Brenda).

Recent years
Lee has continued to record and perform around the world, having previously cut records in four different languages. In 1992, she recorded a duet ("You’ll Never Know") with Willy DeVille on his album Loup Garou.

On October 4, 2000, Lee inducted fellow country music legends Faron Young and Charley Pride into the Country Music Hall of Fame.

On December 13, 2017, Lee's song "Rockin' Around the Christmas Tree" showed up at #37 on the Billboard Hot 100. That song had not seen any chart action in the United States since 1961, although in the UK it has regularly returned to the top 40 in recent times.

Her autobiography, Little Miss Dynamite: The Life and Times of Brenda Lee, was published by Hyperion in 2002.

Lee has been very involved with the Country Music Hall of Fame, announcing the inductees each year and then officially presenting them with their membership medallions at a special ceremony every year. The most recent inductees announced by Lee are Randy Travis, Charlie Daniels and Fred Foster in 2016.

On the Billboard Hot 100 chart dated December 21, 2019, "Rockin' Around the Christmas Tree" reached a new peak of #3 in the United States with 37.1 million streams and 5,000 digital sales sold. The following week it moved up to #2, where it remained for a second week.

Recognition
On September 26, 1986, Brenda Lee was installed in the Atlanta Music Hall of Fame 5th Annual Awards Ceremony held at the Raddison Inn, Atlanta, Georgia. She was named among many other famous recording artists including Riley Puckett, Gid Tanner, Dan Hornsby, Clayton McMichen, and Boots Woodall to name a few. Lee reached the final ballot for induction into the Rock and Roll Hall of Fame in 1990 and 2001 without being inducted, but she was voted into the Hall of Fame in 2002.

Celebrating over 50 years as a recording artist, in September 2006 she was the second recipient of the Jo Meador-Walker Lifetime Achievement award by the Source Foundation in Nashville. In 1997, she was inducted into the Country Music Hall of Fame and is a member of the Rockabilly Hall of Fame and the Hit Parade Hall of Fame.

In 2008, her recording of "Rockin' Around the Christmas Tree" marked 50 years as a holiday standard, and in February 2009 the National Academy of Recording Arts and Sciences gave Lee a Lifetime Achievement Grammy Award.

In 2023, Rolling Stone ranked Lee at number 161 on its list of the 200 Greatest Singers of All Time.

Personal life 
Lee met Ronnie Shacklett at a November 1962 Bo Diddley and Jackie Wilson concert at Nashville's Fairgrounds Coliseum and married him less than six months later, on April 24, 1963. Lee and Shacklett have two daughters, Jolie and Julie (named after Patsy Cline's daughter), and three grandchildren, Taylor, Jordan and Charley.

Lee is also the cousin (by way of her mother's second marriage) to singer Dave Rainwater from The New Christy Minstrels.

Discography

Awards and nominations

Notes

References

External links

 
 Brenda Lee recordings at the Discography of American Historical Recordings.

American country singer-songwriters
American rock singers
1944 births
Living people
Grammy Lifetime Achievement Award winners
Country Music Hall of Fame inductees
American women country singers
American women pop singers
American rockabilly musicians
American women rock singers
Decca Records artists
Charly Records artists
Sony Music Publishing artists
Musicians from Atlanta
United States Army soldiers
Women in the United States Army
20th-century American singers
21st-century American singers
20th-century American women singers
21st-century American women singers
Country musicians from Georgia (U.S. state)
Child rock musicians
Child pop musicians
Singer-songwriters from Georgia (U.S. state)